The nebulous wrasse (Halichoeres nebulosus) is a species of wrasse native to the Indian Ocean and the western Pacific Ocean. This species feeds on fish eggs and benthic invertebrates, including crabs, sea urchins, ophiuroids, polychaetes, sponges and mollusks. Its coloration varies, ranging from brown to dark green. This species can reach  in total length. It can be found in the aquarium trade.

References

External links
 

nebulous wrasse
Fish of the Indian Ocean
Fish of the Pacific Ocean
nebulous wrasse
Taxa named by Achille Valenciennes